The St. Bernard or Saint Bernard is a breed of very large working dog from the Western Alps in Italy and Switzerland. They were originally bred for rescue work by the hospice of the Great St Bernard Pass on the Italian-Swiss border. The hospice, built by and named after Alpine monk, Saint Bernard of Menthon, 
acquired its first dogs between 1660 and 1670. The breed has become famous through tales of Alpine rescues, as well as for its large size, and gentle temperament.

Description
The St. Bernard is recognized internationally today as one of the molosser breeds. It is a giant dog. The coat can be either smooth or rough; the smooth coat being close and flat, while the rough is dense, flat, and more profuse around the neck and legs. The colour is typically a red shade with white, or a mahogany brindle with white. Black shading is usually found on the face and ears. The tail is long and heavy, hanging high. The eyes are usually brown, but sometimes can be icy blue, and should have naturally tight lids, with haws only slightly visible.

History of the St. Bernard

The earliest written records of the St. Bernard are from monks at the Great St Bernard Hospice at the Great St Bernard Pass in 1707, with paintings and drawings of the dog dating even earlier. Early British accounts of the breed described the breed as the Alpine Spaniel. The first evidence that the dogs were in use at the monastery is in two paintings dating to 1690 by Italian artist Salvator Rosa. The most famous St. Bernard to save people at the pass was Barry (sometimes spelled Berry), who reportedly saved somewhere between 40 and 100 lives. There is a monument to Barry in the Cimetière des Chiens, and his body was preserved in the Natural History Museum in Bern.

Another famous dog was Rutor, the faithful companion of the Italian priest Pierre Chanoux, who was named after the peak Tête du Rutor located above the Little St. Bernard pass.
The classic St. Bernard looked very different from the St. Bernard of today because of crossbreeding.  Severe winters from 1816 to 1818 led to increased numbers of avalanches, killing many of the dogs used for breeding while they were performing rescues. In an attempt to preserve the breed, the remaining St. Bernards were crossed with Newfoundlands brought from the Colony of Newfoundland in the 1850s, as well as with other breeds, and so lost much of their use as rescue dogs in the snowy climate of the Alps because the long fur they inherited would freeze and weigh them down.

The dogs never received any special training from the monks. Instead, younger dogs would learn how to perform search and rescue operations from older dogs.

The Swiss St. Bernard Club was founded in Basel on 15 March 1884. The St. Bernard was the first breed entered into the Swiss Stud Book in 1884, and the breed standard was finally approved in 1888. Since then, the breed has been a Swiss national dog.

During World War I St. Bernard dogs assisted the Red Cross and were used to carry supplies to troops in the Italian mountains, stationed in places inaccessible to mules and horses.

The dogs at the Great St Bernard Hospice were working dogs that were smaller than today's show St. Bernards. Originally about the size of a German Shepherd Dog, the St. Bernard grew to the size of today's dog as kennel clubs and dog shows emphasized appearance over the dog's working ability, along with a closed stud book.

An open stud book would have allowed breeders to correct such errors by breeding in working dogs of other dog breeds.

Naming 

The name "St. Bernard" originates from the Great St Bernard Hospice, a traveler's hospice on the often treacherous Great St Bernard Pass in the Western Alps, between Switzerland and Italy. The pass, the lodge, and the dogs are named for Bernard of Menthon, the 11th century Italian monk who established the station.

"St. Bernard" was not in widespread use until the middle of the 19th century. The dogs were called "Saint Dogs", "Noble Steeds", or "Barry Dogs" before that time.

Related breeds 
The breed is strikingly similar to the English Mastiff. The modern St. Bernard is radically different from the original dogs kept at the Great St Bernard Hospice, most notably by being much larger in size and build. Since the late 1800s, the St. Bernard breed has been ever refined, using many different large molosser-type breeds, including the Newfoundland, Great Pyrenees, Greater Swiss Mountain Dog, Great Dane, English Mastiff and possibly the Tibetan Mastiff and Caucasian Shepherd Dog. It is suspected that many of these large breeds were used to redevelop each other to combat the threat of their extinction after World War II, which may explain why all of them played a part in the creation of the St. Bernard as it is seen today.

The four Sennenhund (Swiss mountain dog) breeds, the Grosser Schweizer Sennenhund (Greater Swiss Mountain Dog), the Berner Sennenhund (Bernese Mountain Dog), the Appenzeller Sennenhund (Appenzeller Mountain Dog) and the Entlebucher Sennenhund (Entlebucher Mountain Dog), are similar in appearance to the St. Bernard and share the same location of origin and history, but are tricolour (black, tan and white) rather than red and white or mahogany brindle and white, as the St. Bernand is.

The Russian army kennels crossbred St. Bernards with Caucasian Shepherd Dogs to produce the Moscow Watchdogs that are still used as military service dogs in Russia today. St. Bernards have in common many characteristics of livestock guardian dog breeds.

Kennel Club recognition 
The St. Bernard is recognised internationally by the Fédération Cynologique Internationale as a Molosser in Group 2, Section 2. The breed is recognised by The Kennel Club (UK), the Canadian Kennel Club, and the American Kennel Club in the Working Dog group. The United Kennel Club in the United States places the breed in the Guardian Dog Group. The New Zealand Kennel Club and the Australian National Kennel Council place the breed in the Utility Group

Modern activities – Great St Bernard Pass and Little St Bernard Pass

St. Bernards are no longer used for Alpine rescues, the last recorded instance of which was in 1955. As late as 2004, the Great St Bernard Hospice still retained 18 of the dogs for reasons of tradition and sentiment. In that year, the Barry Foundation created breeding kennels for the breed at the town of Martigny down the Great Saint Bernard Pass, and purchased the remaining dogs from the Hospice. The Barry Foundation's substantial staff keeps 30-40 adult dogs. Alongside an active breeding program, the animals participate in various animal-assisted therapy activities, interact daily with visitors at the museum in Martigny and are involved in various tourist activities, including summer stays at the Hospice.

An annual celebration of the breed takes place on the Little Saint Bernard Pass and at the town of Rosières-Montvalzan on the French side. St. Bernard enthusiasts and breeders gather for a dog show and parades.

Besides social and tourist activities, some animals bred by the Foundation participate in a variety of dog sports, including carting and weight pulling. The Barry Foundation's breeding program's stated goals center on health, sociability and athleticism rather than size.

Health
The very fast growth rate and the weight of a St. Bernard can lead to very serious deterioration of the bones if the dog does not get proper food and exercise. Many dogs are genetically affected by hip dysplasia or elbow dysplasia. Osteosarcoma (bone cancer) has been shown to be hereditary in the breed. They are susceptible to eye disorders called entropion and ectropion, in which the eyelid turns in or out. The breed standard indicates that this is a major fault. The breed is also susceptible to epilepsy and seizures, a heart disease called dilated cardiomyopathy, and eczema.

U.S. and U.K. breed clubs put the average lifespan for a St. Bernard at 8–10 years. A 2003 Danish breed survey (35 dogs) puts the median lifespan at 9.5 years, while a U.K. breed survey in 2004 (53 dogs) puts the median lifespan at 7 years. In the U.K. survey, about one in five lived to >10 years, with the longest-lived dog at 12 years and 9 months.

A study of genetically related polyneuropathy in the breed was conducted.

Temperament 

Known as a classic example of a gentle giant, the Saint Bernard is calm, patient and sweet with adults, and especially children. However, St. Bernards, like all very large dogs, must be well socialized with people and other dogs in order to prevent fearfulness and any possible aggression or territoriality. The biggest threat to small children is being accidentally knocked over by this breed's larger size. Overall, they are a gentle, loyal and affectionate breed, and if socialized are very friendly. Because of its large adult size, it is essential that proper training and socialization begin while the St. Bernard is still a puppy, so as to avoid the difficulties that normally accompany training large dogs. An unruly St. Bernard may present problems for even a strong adult, so control needs to be asserted from the beginning of the dog's training. While generally not instinctively protective, a St. Bernard may bark at strangers, and their size makes them good deterrents against possible intruders.

The St. Bernard was bred to be a working companion and to this day the St. Bernard lives to please its master and is an amiable yet hard worker. St. Bernards have retained their natural ability for scent work and depending on the skill of the trainer and the talents of the dog, St. Bernards can participate in tracking events or even become involved in search and rescue work.

Notability

In media 

St. Bernards are often portrayed, especially in old live action comedies such as Swiss Miss, the TV series Topper, and classic cartoons, wearing small barrels of brandy around their necks. Avalanche victims supposedly drank the brandy to stay warm while awaiting rescue. The monks of the St. Bernard Hospice deny that any St. Bernard has ever carried casks or small barrels around their necks; they attribute the image to an 1820 painting by Edwin Landseer, Alpine Mastiffs Reanimating a Distressed Traveller (which became a popular engraving in 1831 by Charles Landseer). The monks did keep casks around for photographs by tourists.

There was apparently at least one dog that really did carry brandy. In The Percy Anecdotes, by Thomas Byerley, published in 1823, the following anecdote appears, and was often quoted in other books in the 19th century:

The breed of dogs kept by the monks to assist them ... has been long celebrated for its sagacity and fidelity. All the oldest and most tried of them were lately buried, along with some unfortunate travellers, under a valanche [sic]; but three or four hopeful puppies were left at home in the convent, and still survive. The most celebrated of those who are no more, was a dog called Barry. This animal served the hospital for the space of twelve years, during which time he saved the lives of forty individuals. His zeal was indefatigable. Whenever the mountain was enveloped in fogs and snow, he set out in search of lost travellers. He was accustomed to run barking until he lost breath, and would frequently venture on the most perilous places. When he found his strength was insufficient to draw from the snow a traveller benumbed with cold, he would run back to the hospital in search of the monks….

When old age deprived him of strength, the Prior of the Convent pensioned him at Berney, by way of reward. After his death, his hide was stuffed and deposited in the museum of that town. The little phial, in which he carried a reviving liquor for the distressed travellers whom he found among the mountains, is still suspended from his neck.

A Punch magazine cartoon from 1949 depicts a man with a St. Bernard and several puppies, all of which are wearing neck casks. The man explains, "Of course, I only breed them for the brandy."

A frequent joke in old MGM and Warner Brothers shorts is to depict the dogs as compulsive alcoholics who engage in frequent nips from their own casks.

Famous St. Bernards 

 Bachelor, Resident Dog, the Ritz-Carlton, Bachelor Gulch
 Burtonswood (Bossy Boots). English and Irish Crufts Supreme Champion (1974), breeder was the late Miss Marjorie Hinds
 Bamse, a Norwegian dog honoured for exploits during World War II on a memorial statue in Montrose, Scotland, where he died in 1944; also awarded the PDSA Gold Medal for animal bravery
 Barry, famous Alpine rescue dog
 Bernie, mascot of the Colorado Avalanche
 Bernie "Saint" Bernard, mascot of the saints in Dubuque
 Bernie, mascot of the Northampton Saints
 Gumbo, team mascot for the New Orleans Saints
 Porthos, J. M. Barrie's dog
 Schnorbitz, on-stage partner of British comedian Bernie Winters during his later career
 Schotzie and Schotzie "02", beloved pets and mascots of the Cincinnati Reds' owner 
 Scipio Saint Bernard of Orville Wright(Wayback Machine)
 Shirley Temple and a St. Bernard friend.
 Wallace (currently Wallace VI), mascot of the Canadian Scottish Regiment (Princess Mary's)

Fictional dogs 
 See generally: List of fictional dogs

 Barabbas, from the 1969 Walt Disney film My Dog the Thief. An air-traffic reporter discovers that his partner--a St. Bernard dog--has accidentally swiped a priceless necklace from a jewel-smuggling gang.
  Båtsman, a St. Bernard in Astrid Lindgren's story Vi på Saltkråkan
  Beethoven (from the film series of the same name) The 1992 comedy film Beethoven features a friendly but troublesome  longhaired St. Bernard and, in later sequels, his mate and their brood of unruly pups. According to the producers of the sequel Beethoven's 2nd, the St. Bernards used in the film grew so fast during filming that over 100 St. Bernard puppies were cast to portray the sequel's four puppies (Tchaikovsky, Chubby, Dolly, and Mo) and their mother (Missy).
 Bolivar a.k.a. Bornworthy and Bernie, Donald Duck's non-anthropomorphic pet, and his son Behemoth
 Buck, from Jack London's 1903 novel, The Call of the Wild, is described as half St. Bernard and half "Scotch shepherd dog", but was rendered as a full St. Bernard in at least one of the six movie versions.
  Cujo, a dog who had his friendly demeanour ruthlessly taken from him by rabies and became crazed, terrorizing some of the residents of the fictional town of Castle Rock, Maine from the 1981 Stephen King novel Cujo and the 1983 film of the same name. 
 George, eponymous dog in the film George! (1971) and its 1972–73 spin-off television series.
 Josef, (Niebla in the spanish version) from the Japanese anime series Heidi, Girl of the Alps (Alps no Shoujo Heidi), and the 2015 remake.
 Nana, in the Disney and Columbia Peter Pan films (but a Newfoundland in J. M. Barrie's original play and novel)
 Neil, the martini-slurping St. Bernard of George and Marion Kerby in the 1950s TV series Topper.  This was a follow-up to the films Topper, Topper Takes a Trip, and Topper Returns.
 Sumo, a St. Bernard belonging to Lt. Hank Anderson in the video game Detroit: Become Human.
 Unnamed "faithful hound" who discovers the frozen body of a traveler bearing "a banner with a strange device" attempting to cross the St. Bernard Pass in Henry Wadsworth Longfellow's poem "Excelsior".
 Unnamed St. Bernard in the Looney Tunes short Piker's Peak who rescues a frozen Yosemite Sam, then mixes and drinks a cocktail.

Legend 
The famous St. Bernard Barry found a small boy in the snow and persuaded the child to climb on his back. The dog then carried the boy to safety.

See also
 Dogs portal
 List of dog breeds
 Dog sports

References

Footnotes

Citations

General sources

External links

 

FCI breeds
Dog breeds originating in Switzerland
Dog breeds originating in Italy
Animals in Christianity